Giuditta Rissone (10 March 1895 – 22 June 1977) was an Italian film actress who appeared in 25 films between 1933 and 1966. She was born in Genoa and died in Rome. Giuditta Rissone married the director and actor Vittorio De Sica in 1937 in Asti, in the Montferrat region of Piedmont. Her brother Checco Rissone was also an actor.

Selected filmography

 Bad Subject (1933) – Susanna, Willy's sister
 La segretaria per tutti (1933)
 Il trattato scomparso (1933) – Miss Alice Baskerville
 Giallo (1934)
 I Love You Only (1936) – Aunt Giuditta
 Lohengrin (1936) – Marianna
 These Children (1937) – Aunt Lucia
 Triumph of Love (1938) – Aunt Lucia
 At Your Orders, Madame (1939) – Evelina Watron
 La fanciulla di Portici (1940) – Marchioness Del Vasto
 Schoolgirl Diary (1941) – boarding school director
 The Adventuress from the Floor Above (1941) – Clara Marchini
 Teresa Venerdì (1941) – governess Anna
 Invisible Chains (1942) – Mrs. Matilde Silvagni
 Love Story (1942)
 Four Steps in the Clouds (1942) – Clara Bianchi
 Stasera niente di nuovo (1942) – Clelia, the landlady
 In due si soffre meglio (1943) – Mrs. Barduzzi
 Lively Teresa (1943) – Matilde Mari, Alberto's mother
 Nessuno torna indietro (1945) – Dora Belluzzi
 Eugenie Grandet (1946) – Eugenia's mother
 Toto Tours Italy (1948) – Mrs. Casamandrei
 Torment (1950) – Mother Celeste
 8½ (1963) – Guido's mother
 La ragazza in prestito (1964) – Mario's mother

References

External links

1895 births
1977 deaths
Italian film actresses
Actors from Genoa
20th-century Italian actresses